Krohns Lake, is a spring-fed lake southwest of Algoma, Wisconsin, in Kewaunee County. The lake is part of the Tri-Lakes Association, who are in charge of this lake, East Alaska Lake, and West Alaska Lake.

Fish species
Bluegill 
Brook trout 
Brown trout 
Largemouth bass 
Rainbow trout

References

 General Lake information
 Lake Association information

Lakes of Kewaunee County, Wisconsin